The Culture of French Canada, French Canadian Culture or the Culture of Francophone Canadians may refer to:
 The culture of Quebec
 Acadian culture, the culture of the French-speaking people of Acadia, in the Maritime provinces
 The culture of Franco-Ontarians, the French-speaking people of Ontario
 The culture of Franco-Manitobans, the French-speaking people of Manitoba

See also
 Francophone Canadians
 French Canadian
 French language in Canada
 French Canada (disambiguation)